The Treasurer of Maryland is responsible for the management and investment of the cash deposits, bond sale revenue, and all other securities and collateral of the state of Maryland in the United States.  In addition, the Treasurer conducts regular briefings for the Maryland General Assembly and prepares an annual report on the status of the Treasurer's Office.  The Treasurer also sits on the Maryland Board of Public Works.  Since 2021, the Treasurer of Maryland has been Dereck E. Davis.

From 1775 until 1843, Maryland had a separate state treasurer for both the eastern and western shores.  In 1843, the office of the Treasurer of the Eastern Shore was abolished, and the Treasurer of the Western Shore assumed responsibility for both sides of the Chesapeake Bay.  The position was renamed in 1852 to account for its statewide coverage.  Since the Maryland Constitution of 1851, the Treasurer has been elected by both houses of the Maryland General Assembly.  The term length of treasurers was initially two years, but was increased to four years in 1922.

Treasurers of Maryland 1775 to 1852
The following is a chronological list of the Treasurers of Maryland.  There were initially separate treasurers for each shore of the state.

Treasurers of the Eastern Shore of Maryland

Treasurers of the Western Shore of Maryland

Treasurers of Maryland 1852 to present

See also
 Comptroller of Maryland (Chief Financial Officer)

References

Government of Maryland
1775 establishments in Maryland